Samworth Academy may refer to:

Samworth Church Academy
Samworth Enterprise Academy
Nottingham University Samworth Academy